On June 23, 2013, 19 people, all Romanians, were killed and another 28 wounded in a bus crash near Podgorica in Montenegro. The bus, with registration plate number B 123 MMJ, skidded off the road, crashing into a ravine about 40 m below. A local child who was on the road at the time of the accident was also injured, but not seriously. The accident reportedly occurred around 5 to 6 pm 30 km north of Podgorica, the capital and largest city of Montenegro. There were about 50 people on board, all of them Romanian citizens.

The accident occurred during a rainstorm on a narrow road in mountainous terrain. The exact cause of the accident is unknown. The bus was carrying around 48 passengers, two drivers and a tourist guide, and was headed towards the Adriatic Sea. Attempts to rescue the survivors were inhibited by the rocky terrain of the region.

Montenegro's Interior Minister Raško Konjević described the crash as "an extremely serious accident". Milo Đukanović, the Prime Minister of Montenegro, also visited the victims at the hospital, and expressed his condolences to the Romanian Ambassador to Montenegro. The Serbian Government also offered medical assistance for the injured.

Victor Ponta, the Prime Minister of Romania, announced  a day of national mourning  for the date June 26. On the same day Montenegro also observed a day of national mourning in solidarity with Romania.

See also
List of road accidents (2010–present)

References

External links
Location of the accident in Google Maps
The route of the bus in Google Maps
Video simulation of the crash
Official bus operator Montenegrin journey page

2013 in Montenegro
Podgorica bus crash
Bus incidents in Montenegro
21st century in Podgorica
June 2013 events in Europe
Events in Podgorica